</noinclude>
First Lady or First Gentleman of Puerto Rico is the official title given by the government of Puerto Rico to the spouse of the governor of Puerto Rico or the relatives of the governor, should the holder be unmarried. The governor's spouse leads the Office of the First Lady or First Gentleman of Puerto Rico.

The role of first lady of Puerto Rico is vacant since the inauguration of Pedro Pierluisi on January 2, 2021.

Role
The position of First Lady or First Gentleman carries no official duty and receives no compensation for their service. They generally oversee the administration of La Fortaleza, the mansion that serves as the governor's residence and office. They also organize events and civic programs, and typically get involved in different charities and social causes.

Portraits
The official portraits of each first lady or first gentleman, beginning with Governor Jesús T. Piñero's wife, former first lady Aurelia Bou Ledesma, have been exhibited in La Fortaleza since Rafael Hernández Colón's administration. The portraits were originally located in the staircase that leads to the third floor private gubernatorial residence  However, they have been relocated to several ceremonial rooms adjacent to the "Kennedy Bedroom" on the second floor of the executive mansion which is accessible to the public in most tours held at La Fortaleza.

First Lady Lucé Vela loaned the portraits to the Puerto Rico Department of State, to be seen by the public during two weeks in May 2009. The opening reception of the exhibit, presided by Secretary of State Kenneth McClintock, was attended by three governors (Luis Fortuño, Rafael Hernández Colón, and Carlos Romero Barceló), and four first ladies (Jeannette Ramos, Kate Donnelly, María Elena González, and Lucé Vela).

Most recently, a new official portrait of Lucé Vela was unveiled in La Fortaleza in July 2017. Official portraits of former first lady Wilma Pastrana and her husband, former governor Alejandro García Padilla, both painted by the late artist Arnaldo Roche Rabell, were added to residence's collection in November 2016.

First ladies and gentlemen of Puerto Rico (since 1949)

See also
 Governor of Puerto Rico
 List of governors of Puerto Rico

References

External links
 First Lady on La Fortaleza